Sons of the Revolution is a hereditary society which was founded in 1876 and educates the public about the American Revolution. The General Society Sons of the Revolution headquarters is a Pennsylvania non-profit corporation located at Williamsburg, Virginia. The Society is governed by a board of managers, an executive committee, officers, standing committees and their members, and staff. The General Society includes 28 State Societies and chapters in the United States, as well as Europe.

It describes its purpose as:

To perpetuate the memory of the men, who in the military, naval and civil service of the Colonies and of the Continental Congress by their acts or counsel, achieved the Independence of the Country, and to further the proper celebration of the anniversaries of the birthday of Washington, and of prominent events connected with the War of the Revolution; to collect and secure for preservation the rolls, records, and other documents relating to that period; to inspire the members of the Society with the patriotic spirit of the forefathers; to promote the feeling of friendship among them.

Membership 
Membership is open to:

Any male person above the age of eighteen years, of good character, and a descendant of one who, as a military, naval, or marine officer, soldier, sailor or marine, in actual service, under the authority of the original thirteen Colonies or States or of the Continental Congress, and remaining always loyal to such authority, or a descendant of one who signed the Declaration of Independence, or of one who, as a member of the Continental Congress or of the Congress of any of the Colonies or States, or as an official appointed by or under the authority of any such legislative bodies, actually assisted in the establishment of American Independence by services rendered during the War of Revolution, becoming thereby liable to conviction of treason, against the government of Great Britain, but remaining always loyal to the authority of the Colonies or States, or who served honorably in a military or naval expedition against the British during the War of the Revolution under the authority of the French or Spanish governments....

Junior, senior and life memberships are also available. Members receive benefits which include:
 Invitation to general-society, state-society and chapter events, including the triennial meetings and the annual Let Freedom Ring celebrations;
 Issues of the general-society quarterly, Drumbeat and
 Availability of accoutrements, including membership certificate, rosette, formal and informal insignia, and other regalia.

Based on the President's message from 2015, there are approximately 5,000 members.

History

Founding 
Sons of the Revolution was founded on February 22, 1876, at New York City, primarily by leading members of The Society of the Cincinnati and the businessman John Austin Stevens. He disagreed with Society of the Cincinnati requirements limiting membership to the eldest male descendants based on the rules of primogeniture. Stevens held a preliminary meeting on December 18, 1875, at the New-York Historical Society at New York. At a second meeting held in January 1876, the first constitution was adopted and a flier which invited members was published.

After a few years of little activity,  an elaborate "turtle feast" was held on December 4, 1883, in the Long Room of historic Fraunces Tavern. The banquet was to commemorate the centennial of General George Washington's farewell there to his officers. The 1883 dinner helped recruit 40 new members, and the group was reorganized as the Sons of the Revolution in the State of New York Inc. In the early years after the reorganization, Society of the Cincinnati President-General Hamilton Fish gave much support and encouragement to the New York Society. In his obituary, he described Sons members as, "Younger brothers of the Cincinnati".

Formation of state societies 
Besides residents of New York City, many gentlemen from nearby states with business or other ties in New York City had, from the beginning, been either members or prospective members of the Society. The possibility that some of them might eventually form societies in their own states had been recognized in the Society Constitution. The growth in the number of members by 1888 made this a more promising likelihood. The first of the new State Societies, the Pennsylvania Society of Sons of the Revolution was organized on April 3, 1888. This was accomplished chiefly through the efforts of John W. Jordan, later librarian of the Historical Society of Pennsylvania and Josiah Granville Leach.

The creation of a new State Society in Pennsylvania started a debate over the Society Constitution. Of primary concern was who would charter or create new State Societies.  The Pennsylvania Society was created by members; independent of the New York Society.  On March 11, 1889, The Sons of the Revolution in the District of Columbia was chartered by the New York Society.  This debate was resolved by the creation of the General Society and a new Constitution on April 18, 1890. The General Society charters new societies but, "The State Societies shall regulate all matters respecting their own affairs".

General society formation 

Recognizing that members from states other than New York might form state societies in their states, the group's officers amended its constitution in 1884 to provide that state societies may organize as "auxiliary branches". Consequently, the Pennsylvania society was formed in 1888, and the District of Columbia society was formed in 1889.

The General Society constitution was proposed on February 12, 1890, in Philadelphia and adopted on March 8, 1890, in New York. Members of the three state societies held a meeting on April 19, 1890, in Washington to inaugurate the General Society. In the next few years, several more state societies were formed and the General Society developed a more national character.

Activities 
The General Society and state societies offer patriotic, historical and educational activities for its members and the public. In addition to various dinners, exhibits and holiday events, the societies produce the following specific activities. Several state societies own and operate historic buildings.

Triennial general meetings 
Since its founding, the General Society has held triennial meetings of the membership. The 41st meeting was held on October 4 through 7, 2012 in Savannah, Georgia, by the Georgia society.  The 42nd meeting was held on October 1 through 4, 2015, in Williamsburg, Virginia, by the Virginia Society.

Citizen awards 
The General Society has established various citizen awards, given to individuals and state societies for their work to continue the SR mission and honor the memory of the participants of the Revolution. The awards include the Modern Patriot Award, the Patrick Henry Award, the Jay Harris Award, the Richard Farmer Hess Leadership Award, the Trent Trophy, the Membership Achievement Award and the Presidential Commendation of Merit.

Fraunces Tavern 

Since 1904, the New York Society has owned and operated the Fraunces Tavern as a museum and restaurant. They restored the building, which had a prominent place in pre-Revolution and Revolution history. The society claims the tavern is Manhattan's oldest surviving building.

The Fraunces Tavern Museum maintains several galleries of art and artifacts about the Revolution, including the McEntee "Sons of the Revolution" Gallery that displays much of the Society history.

Green End Fort 
The Rhode Island society has maintained Green End Fort, in the Village of Green's End on the border of Newport and Middletown, since 1969 when its owner, Newport Historical Society, "expressed hope that the Sons would 'maintain the Fort as a memorial and eventually acquire the property.'" The fort was believed to have been built in 1777 by British troops as part of the defenses of Newport, but more recent scholarship indicates it was probably built by the French army under Comte de Rochambeau in 1780.

Grave-marker and wreath placements 

Several state societies have placed Society markers and wreaths at the graves of identified revolutionary patriots; for instance, the Massachusetts society placed markers at the graves of Samuel Adams and James Otis Jr., which are located in the Granary Burying Ground at Boston. The General Society joined the Georgia society in 2005 to place a wreath at the re-interment of U.S. Brig. Gen. Casimir Pulaski in Savannah, Ga.

"Let Freedom Ring" celebrations 
Since July 4, 1969, the Pennsylvania society has sponsored "Let Freedom Ring", the nationwide celebration of those who helped achieve the nation's independence during the Revolution. According to U.S. Senate Concurrent Resolution 25 of 1963, bells across the nation are rung 13 times at exactly 2:00 p.m. EDT in honor of the 13 original states represented by the signers of the Declaration of Independence. At the appointed hour, four young descendants of the signers tap Philadelphia's famous Liberty Bell, setting off the chimes of freedom from bell towers throughout the nation. A series of related patriotic festivities take place in the Independence Hall area, including a colorful parade of Revolutionary War flags, fifes and drums, and a wreath-laying ceremony at the Tomb of the Unknown Soldier of the Revolutionary War at Washington Square.

Military awards 
The General Society and several State Societies have established various educational and military awards, which are given to individuals and groups for their academic or service performance. The awards include the Annapolis Cup, which was created in 1905 and given annually by the general society and the Maryland society to a U.S. Naval Academy midshipman; the Knox Trophy (New York), which was created in 1910 and given annually by the New York society to a U.S. Military Academy at West Point cadet; the Capt. Gustavus Conyngham Award which was created in 1999 and given annually by the New York society to a U.S. Merchant Marine Academy at Kings Point midshipman; the Recognition Award, which was created in 2002 and given annually by the Massachusetts society to a U.S. Army ROTC cadet; and the Knox Trophy (Massachusetts), which was created in 1924 and given annually until 1940 by the Massachusetts society to a U.S. Army field-artillery battery and a "redleg" artilleryman.

Evacuation Day observances 
The New York society has organized infrequent Evacuation Day observances of the anniversary of the British departure on November 25, 1783, from New York after the Revolution. After a controversial New York Police Department denial on May 21, 2008, of a New York society application for a parade permit, officials accepted the application on July 30, 2008, for society members to march down Broadway from New York City Hall to Battery Park, "where reenactors in period costumes will lower a Union Jack and raise the Stars and Stripes in a symbolic reprise of what happened in 1783. British and French diplomats, along with others who had roles in the American colonies' struggle for independence," were invited to attend.

Partial list of notable members 

Many notable celebrities and public leaders in the United States have been members of the Sons of the Revolution.

They include the following persons:

Presidents of the United States
 George W. Bush of Texas
 George H. W. Bush of Texas
 Gerald Ford of Michigan
 Dwight D. Eisenhower of Kansas
 Harry S. Truman of Missouri
 Herbert Hoover of Iowa
 Theodore Roosevelt of New York
 Benjamin Harrison of Ohio

United States Senators
 U.S. Sen. Lamar Alexander of Tennessee
 U.S. Sen. and Governor Morgan Bulkeley of Connecticut
 U.S. Sen. Cornelius Cole of California
 U.S. Sen. Frank Putnam Flint of California
 U.S. Sen. John McCain of Arizona
 U.S. Sen. Hugh Scott of Pennsylvania
 U.S. Sen. Lawrence Tyson of Tennessee

United States Representatives
 U.S. Rep. Franklin Bartlett of New York
 U.S. Rep. Perry Belmont of New York
 U.S. Rep. Charles E. Bennett of Florida
 U.S. Rep. Thornton G. Berry Jr. of West Virginia
 U.S. Rep. Chester C. Bolton of Ohio
 U.S. Rep. Edmund N. Carpenter of Pennsylvania
 U.S. Rep. Howard Coble of North Carolina
 U.S. Rep. William H. Douglas of New York
 U.S. Rep. Charles I. Faddis of Pennsylvania
 U.S. Rep. E. Hart Fenn of Connecticut
 U.S. Rep. Barry Goldwater Jr. of California
 U.S. Rep. Benjamin F. James of Pennsylvania
 U.S. Rep. Jefferson M. Levy of New York
 U.S. Rep. George B. McClellan Jr. of New York
 U.S. Rep. Cornelius A. Pugsley of New York
 U.S. Rep. Dana Rohrabacher of California
 U.S. Rep. Jacob van Vechten Olcott of New York

Ambassadors
 U.S. Ambassador Larz Anderson of Massachusetts
 U.S. Ambassador S.G.W. Benjamin of New York
 U.S. Ambassador Lewis Einstein of New York
 U.S. Ambassador Charles S. Francis of New York
 U.S. Ambassador Hampson Gary of Texas
 U.S. Ambassador George A. Gordon of New York
 U.S. Ambassador Franklin Mott Gunther of the District of Columbia
 U.S. Ambassador John Langeloth Loeb Jr. of New York
 U.S. Ambassador J. William Middendorf of Rhode Island
 U.S. Ambassador Richard C. Patterson Jr. of New York
 U.S. Ambassador Phelps Phelps of Germany
 U.S. Ambassador Charles H. Sherrill of New York

Other government officials
 Secretary of the Interior James Rudolph Garfield of California
 Secretary of the Interior Ethan A. Hitchcock
 Secretary of War John W. Weeks of Massachusetts
 Secretary of the Treasury and Federal Judge William Adams Richardson
 Governor of Maryland John Lee Carroll
 Governor of West Virginia Arch A. Moore, Jr.
 Governor of New Mexico Territory LeBaron Bradford Prince
 Panama Canal Zone Gov. Chester Harding of the District of Columbia
 Assistant Secretary of the Navy Charles H. Darling of Vermont
 Attorney for the Southern District of New York William Hayward of New York
 Attorney for the District of Connecticut Francis H. Parker of Connecticut
 Civil Service Commission Member William Gorham Rice of New York
 Mayor of New York George B. McClellan Jr.
 Los Angeles City Council member George P. McLain
 Consul Charles H. Delavan of New York
 Consul Augustin W. Ferrin of New York
 Consul Thomas H. Norton of New York
 Consul James R. Parsons Jr. of New York
 Court of Appeals for the 2nd Circuit Judge J. Edward Lumbard of New York
 Federal Trade Commission Chairman Robert E. Freer of Ohio
 Solicitor General James M. Beck of Pennsylvania
 U.S. Treasurer Daniel Nash Morgan of Connecticut

Military and naval officers
 Admiral of the Navy George Dewey, USN of Vermont
 Commandant of the Marine Corps Gen. Charles C. Krulak, USMC of California
 Commandant of the Marine Corps Col. Charles Grymes McCawley, USMA of the District of Columbia
 Quartermaster General of the Army Charles G. Sawtelle, USA of the District of Columbia
 Vice Admiral Howard Fithian Kingman, USN of California
 Maj. Gen. Frank Ross McCoy
 Maj. Gen. William Denison Whipple, USA of New York
 Brig. Gen. and Medal of Honor recipient Richard Napoleon Batchelder, USA of the District of Columbia
 Brig. Gen.  Morris Cooper Foote of New York
 Brig. Gen. Royal T. Frank, USA
 Brig. Gen. Green Clay Goodloe, USMC of the District of Columbia
 Brig. Gen. Lyman W.V. Kennon, USA of Rhode Island
 Brig. Gen. Charles L. McCawley, USMC of the District of Columbia
 Brig. Gen. Samuel Mills, USV
 Brig. Gen. and Medal of Honor recipient Edmund Rice, USA of Massachusetts
 Brig. Gen. and Academy Award-winning motion-picture actor James Stewart, USAFR of California
 Brevet Maj. Gen. Nicholas Longworth Anderson, USA
 Brevet Maj. Gen Harrison Gray Otis, USA of California
 Brevet Brig. Gen. DeLancey Floyd-Jones, USA of New York
 Chaplain (Colonel) Michael A. Milton, USA-R of North Carolina
 Col. Charles Greenlief Ayers, USA of New York
 Col. J. Fulmer Bright, USA of Virginia
 Col. Bibb Graves, USA of Alabama
 Col. Lawrence D. Tyson, USA of Tennessee
 Col. Stephen Edward Huskey, USA of Texas
 Maj. Asa Bird Gardiner, USA of New York
 Maj. Pierre Christie Stevens, USA of the District of Columbia
 Brevet Maj. James Edward Carpenter, USA of Pennsylvania
 Lt. Orlando Henderson Petty, USN, Medal of Honor recipient of Pennsylvania

Distinguished citizens
 Historian, author, genealogist and heraldist Henry L. P. Beckwith
 American author and screenwriter James Warner Bellah of California
 Financier Perry Belmont of Rhode Island
 Atchison, Topeka and Santa Fe Railway President Samuel T. Bledsoe of California
 Motion-picture actor Richard Dix of California
 1932 Summer Olympics President William May Garland of California
 Naval Historian John B. Hattendorf of Rhode Island
 Studebaker Corporation President Paul G. Hoffman of California
 Railroad executive Henry E. Huntington of California
 Bank of America founder Orra E. Monnette of California
 Geologist and explorer Raphael Pumpelly of Rhode Island
 Businessman Frederick H. Rindge of California
 Motion-picture Director W. S. Van Dyke of California
 Science-fiction writer Robert A. Heinlein of Missouri

See also 

 Commemoration of the American Revolution
 Children of the American Revolution
 Daughters of the American Revolution
 Society of the Cincinnati
 Sons of the American Revolution
 The United Empire Loyalists' Association of Canada

References

External links 

 
 

1876 establishments in New York (state)
Aftermath of the American Civil War
American Revolution veterans and lineage organizations
Charities based in Virginia
Lineage societies
Non-profit organizations based in Williamsburg, Virginia
Nonpartisan organizations in the United States
Organizations established in 1876